Albert Leslie Hill (19 April 1916 – 30 May 1993) was an Australian rules footballer who played with Collingwood, Fitzroy and North Melbourne in the Victorian Football League (VFL). He went to Terang as coach in 1948.

Notes

External links 

Profile from Collingwood Forever

1916 births
1993 deaths
Australian rules footballers from Victoria (Australia)
Collingwood Football Club players
Fitzroy Football Club players
North Melbourne Football Club players
Terang Football Club players
Terang Football Club coaches